SGO may refer to:

SGO :Scouts and Guides Organization in india

 SG Oslebshausen, a former basketball club
 St George Airport (Queensland) (IATA code)
 SGO (railway station), a main Indian railway station
 Society of Gynecologic Oncologists, an American medical association
 SGO Corporation